Christoph Richter (1596 – 24 February 1669) was mayor of Stettin, Swedish Pomerania (now Szczecin, Poland) from 1659 to 1669, and a Landrat.

History 
Christoph Richter was born in 1596. He studied philosophy at the University of Greifswald. In 1659, he became the mayor of Stettin, Swedish Pomerania (now Szczecin, Poland). He died in office, on 24 February 1669, and was buried on 15 March 1669.

Notes

References 

1596 births
1669 deaths
Politicians from Szczecin
Mayors of places in Sweden
Mayors of Szczecin
People from Swedish Pomerania
16th-century Swedish politicians
University of Greifswald alumni